The Austin Motor Company Limited was an English manufacturer of motor vehicles, founded in 1905 by Herbert Austin in Longbridge. In 1952 it was merged with Morris Motors Limited in the new holding company British Motor Corporation (BMC) Limited, keeping its separate identity. The marque Austin was used until 1987. The trademark is currently owned by the Chinese firm SAIC Motor, after being transferred from bankrupt subsidiary Nanjing Automotive which had acquired it with MG Rover Group in July 2005.

History

1905–1918: Formation and development
While running the original Wolseley business, which had a highly cyclical sales pattern, Herbert Austin searched for products with a steady demand. Starting in 1895, he built three cars in his free time. They were among Britain's first cars. The third car, a four-wheeler, was completed in 1899. By 1901 his fellow directors could not see future profit in motor vehicles and so with their blessing and the backing of the Vickers brothers Austin started a separate car manufacturing business still using the name Wolseley.

In 1905 he fell out with Thomas and Albert Vickers over engine design. Leaving his creation, Wolseley, which he had made Britain's largest motor vehicle manufacturer, Austin obtained the backing of steel magnate Frank Kayser for his own enterprise. Kayser provided funds through mortgages and loans, debentures and guarantees to the Midland Bank thereby allowing Austin to keep virtually total ownership of his own business through his personal savings. Further assistance came from Dunlop patent holder Harvey du Cros. However, Austin's great rival, William Morris, was able to enter the industry proper (he first repaired cars) a little later funding his operation entirely from his own resources.

In November 1905 Herbert Austin acquired a disused printing works which was less than ten years old. It was located seven miles south-west of Birmingham in the small village of Longbridge (then still within Worcestershire). The following month The Austin Motor Company Limited was incorporated. In the last week of April 1906 a large body of motorists travelled to Longbridge "where snow lay full three inches deep on the ground and was still falling fast" to see the new Austin car, a conventional four-cylinder model with chain drive. It was available as a 15/20 hp complete at £500 (chassis, £425) and a 25/30 hp for £650 (chassis, £550). The sole concessionaire for sale of the cars was Mr Harvey Du Cros junior.

Two things were noticeable about Austin's new design. He had parted from the Vickers brothers because he had refused to use the then more conventional vertical engine in Wolseley cars. His new car had a vertical engine and, in all but minor detail, was identical to the English-built Clément-Gladiators assembled in the same factory.

A further injection of capital was needed in 1906 and William Harvey Du Cros (1846–1918) joined the board of directors. After that Harvey Du Cros junior of the Swift Cycle Co and Austin each held approximately half of the ordinary capital. Herbert Austin remained chairman and managing director.

Austin's cars, like Wolseley's, were luxury vehicles. The published customer list included Russian Grand Dukes, Princesses, Bishops, high officials of the Spanish government and a long list of Britain's highest nobility.

Sources
Note: in 1912 Wolseley sold 3,000 cars.

In February 1914 Austin-manufactured bodies in tourer, limousine, landaulette and coupé styles could be provided with engines of 15, 20, 30 and 60 hp. Ambulances and commercial vehicles were also provided.

Austin became a public listed company in 1914 when the capital was increased to £650,000. At that time in number of cars produced it probably ranked fifth after Wolseley (still largest), Humber, Sunbeam and Rover.

The Austin Motor Co. grew enormously during the First World War fulfilling government contracts for aircraft, shells, heavy guns and generating sets and 1,600 three-ton trucks most of which were sent to Russia. The workforce expanded from around 2,500 to 22,000.

1919–1939: Interwar success

After the war Herbert Austin decided on a one-model policy based on the 3620 cc 20 hp engine. Versions included cars, commercials and even a tractor, but sales volumes were never enough to fill the vast factory built during wartime. The company went into receivership in 1921 but rose again after financial restructuring. Though Herbert Austin remained chairman he was no longer managing director and from that time decisions were made by committee.

Critical to the recovery was the appointment in 1922 of a new finance director, Ernest Payton with the backing of the Midland Bank, and a new works director in charge of car production, Carl Engelbach, at the insistence of the creditors' committee. This triumvirate of Austin, Payton and Engelbach steered the company's fortunes through the interwar years.

In a quest to expand market share, smaller cars were introduced, the 1661 cc Twelve in 1922 and, later the same year, the Seven, an inexpensive, simple small car and one of the earliest to be directed at a mass market. One of the reasons for a market demand for a cars like the Austin 7 was the British tax code. In 1930 every personal car was taxed by its engine size, which in American dollars was $2.55 per cubic inch of piston displacement. As an example, the owner of an Austin 7 in England, which sold for approximately $455, would have to pay a yearly engine tax of $39. In comparison, the owner in England of a Ford Model-A would have to pay $120 per year in an engine tax. And this system of engine displacement tax was common in other European nations as well in the 1930s. At one point, the "Baby Austin" was built under licence by the fledgling BMW of Germany (as the Dixi); by the Japanese manufacturer Datsun; as the Bantam in the United States; and as the Rosengart in France. In England the Austin was the most produced car in 1930

The American Austin Car Company struggled to sell tiny Austin cars in the US market. It operated as a largely independent subsidiary from 1929 to 1934 was revived after bankruptcy under the name "American Bantam" from 1937 to 1941. They became best known as the first company to submit the Bantam Reconnaissance Car working prototype, saving time by using Austin nose and fender parts of what would evolve into the extremely successful and iconic WWII Willys MB "Jeep". The design was unfortunately handed over to Willys and Ford for production with a revised nose and fender design, while Bantam would largely just build trailers during the war.

With the help of the Seven, Austin weathered the worst of the depression and remained profitable through the 1930s, producing a wider range of cars which was steadily updated by the introduction of all-steel bodies, Girling brakes, and synchromesh gearboxes. However, all the engines retained the same side-valve configuration. Deputy chairman Ernest Payton became chairman in 1941 on the death of Lord Austin. In 1938 Leonard Lord joined the company board and became chairman in 1946 on the death of Ernest Payton.

Nissan
In 1932, Datsun (An automobile manufacturer under the Nissan Concern zaibatsu) built cars infringing Austin patents. From 1934, Datsun began to build Sevens under licence and this operation became the greatest success of Austin's overseas licensing of its Seven. It marked the beginning of Datsun's international success.

In 1952, Austin entered into another agreement with Datsun for assembly of 2,000 imported Austins from "knock-down kits", to be sold in Japan under the Austin trademark. The agreement called for Nissan to make all Austin parts locally within three years, a goal Nissan met. Nissan produced and marketed Austins for seven years. The agreement also gave Nissan rights to use Austin patents, which Nissan used in developing its own engines for its Datsun line of cars. In 1953, British-built Austins were assembled and sold, but by 1955, the Austin A50 – completely assembled by Nissan and featuring a slightly larger body with 1489 cc engine – was on the market in Japan. Nissan produced 20,855 Austins between 1953 and 1959.

1939–1958: War years and post-war years

During the Second World War Austin continued building cars but also made trucks and aircraft, including Short Stirling and Avro Lancaster bombers.

The post-war car range was announced in 1944, and production started in 1945. The immediate post-war range was mainly similar to that of the late 1930s but did include the 16 hp, significant for having the company's first overhead valve engine.

Austin of England
From late 1950 to mid-1952 products, brochures and advertisements displayed in flowing script Austin of England as if in response to Morris' Nuffield Organization. It fell out of use with the financial merger with Morris in BMC.

BMC
In 1952, The Austin Motor Company Limited merged ownership, but not identity, with long-term rival Morris Motors Limited, becoming The British Motor Corporation Limited, with Leonard Lord in charge. William Morris was first chairman but soon retired. Lord, who had stormed out of Morris declaring he would "take Cowley apart brick by brick", ensured Austin was the dominant partner and its (more recently designed OHV) engines were adopted for most of the cars. Various models followed the Morris policy and became badge-engineered versions of each other.

Austin-Healey
Also in 1952, Austin did a deal with Donald Healey, leading to a new marque, Austin-Healey, and a range of sports cars.

1959–1969: Era of revolution

With the threat to fuel supplies resulting from the 1956 Suez Crisis, Lord asked Alec Issigonis, who had been with Morris from 1936 to 1952, to design a small car; the result was the revolutionary Mini, launched in 1959. The Austin version was initially called the Austin Seven, but Morris' Mini Minor name caught the public imagination and the Morris version outsold its Austin twin, so the Austin's name was changed to Mini to follow suit. In 1970, British Leyland dropped the separate Austin and Morris branding of the Mini, and it was subsequently simply "Mini", under the Austin Morris division of BLMC.

The principle of a transverse engine with gearbox in the sump and driving the front wheels was applied to larger cars, beginning with the 1100 of 1963, (although the Morris-badged version was launched 13 months earlier than the Austin, in August 1962), the 1800 of 1964 and the Maxi of 1969. This meant that BMC had spent 10 years developing a new range of front-drive, transverse-engined models, while most competitors had only just started to make such changes.

The big exception to this was the Austin 3-litre. Launched in 1968, it was a rear-wheel drive large car, but it shared the central section of the 1800. It was a sales disaster, with fewer than 10,000 examples being made.

BMC was the first British manufacturer to move into front-wheel drive so comprehensively. Ford did not launch its first front-drive model until 1976 (in Britain), Ford-Germany in 1962 with the Taunus 12M(P4), while Vauxhall's first front-drive model was launched in 1979 and Chrysler UK's first such car was launched in 1975. Front-wheel drive was popular elsewhere in Europe, however, with Renault, Citroen and Simca all using the system at the same time or before BMC. East Germany's Trabant used the system from 1958.

In September 1965 BMC completed the purchase of its major supplier, Pressed Steel. Twelve months later it completed the purchase of Jaguar and in December 1966 changed its name from BMC to BMH, British Motor Holdings Limited. In early 1968 under government pressure BMH merged with Leyland Motors Limited and Austin became a part of the large British Leyland Motor Corporation (BLMC) combine.

1970–1979: Era of turbulence

By 1970 Austin was part of the British Leyland combine. One of Austin's main models of this era was the 1973 Allegro, successor to the 1100/1300 ranges, which was criticised for its bulbous styling which earned it the nickname "Flying pig" as well as the doubtful build quality and indifferent reliability. It was still a strong seller in Britain, although not quite as successful as its predecessor.

The wedge-shaped 18/22 series was launched as an Austin, a Morris and a more upmarket Wolseley in 1975. But within six months, it was rechristened the Princess and wore none of the previous marque badges, becoming a marque in its own right, under the Austin Morris division of British Leyland that had been virtually nationalised in 1975.

It was upgraded at the end of 1981 to become the Austin Ambassador (and gaining a hatchback) but by that time there was little that could be done to disguise the age of the design, and it was too late to make much of an impact on sales.

By the end of the 1970s, the future of Austin and the rest of British Leyland (now known as BL) was looking bleak.

1980–1989: Austin Rover era

The Austin Metro, launched in October 1980, was heralded as the saviour of Austin Motor Company and the whole BL combine. Twenty-one years after the launch of the Mini, it gave BL a much-needed modern supermini to compete with the recently launched likes of the Ford Fiesta, Vauxhall Nova, VW Polo and Renault 5. It was an instant hit with buyers and was one of the most popular British cars of the 1980s. It was intended as a replacement for the Mini but, in fact, the Mini actually went on to outlast the Metro. It was facelifted in October 1984 and gained a 5-door version.

In 1982, most of the car division of the by now somewhat shrunken British Leyland (BL) company was rebranded as the Austin Rover Group, with Austin acting as the "budget" and mainstream brand to Rover's more luxurious models. The MG badge was revived for sporty versions of the Austin models, of which the MG Metro 1300 was the first. The Morris and Triumph brands were axed in 1984.

Austin revitalised its entry into the small family-car market in March 1983 with the launch of its all-new Maestro, a spacious five-door hatchback that replaced the elderly Allegro and Maxi and was popular in the early years of its production life, although sales had started to dip dramatically by the end of the decade.

April 1984 saw the introduction of the Maestro-derived Montego saloon, successor to the Morris Ital. The new car received praise for its interior space and comfort as well as its handling, but early build-quality problems took time to overcome. The spacious estate version, launched six months later, was one of the most popular load carriers in Britain for several years after its launch.

In 1986, Austin Rover's holding company BL plc became Rover Group plc and was privatised by selling it to British Aerospace (BAe) in 1988.

Plans to replace the Metro with a radical new model, based on the ECV3 research vehicle and aiming for 100 mpg, led to the Austin AR6 of 1984–86, with several prototypes tested and production expected to start before the end of the decade. The desire to lose the Austin name and take Rover "upmarket" led to this project's demise in early 1987.

In 1988, the Austin badge was phased out and Austin Rover became the Rover Group from the following year. The Austin cars continued to be manufactured, although they ceased to be Austins. They became "marque-less" in their home market with bonnet badges the same shape as the Rover longship badge but without "Rover" written on them. Instead any badging just showed the model of the car: a Montego of this era, for instance, would have a grille badge simply saying "Montego", while the rear badges just said "Montego" and the engine size/trim level. A revamped Metro was launched in May 1990 and got the new K-series engine. It then became the Rover Metro.

Despite sales of both the Maestro and Montego being in decline by 1990, these ranges continued in production until 1994 and never wore a Rover badge on their bonnets in Britain. They were, however, sometimes referred to as "Rovers" in the press and elsewhere. Their place in the Rover range was gradually filled by a new generation of Rover models.

Possible revival
The rights to the Austin name passed to British Aerospace and then to BMW when each bought the Rover Group. The rights were subsequently sold to MG Rover, created when BMW sold the business. Following MG Rover's collapse and sale, Nanjing Automobile Group owns the Austin name and Austin's historic assembly plant in Longbridge. At the Nanjing International Exhibition in May 2006, Nanjing announced it might use the Austin name on some of the revived MG Rover models, at least in the Chinese market. However, Nanjing is for the moment concentrating on reviving the MG brand. The MG brand is traditionally used for sports cars and Nanjing has no rights to the Rover name, so a revival of the Austin name would seem a logical brand for selling more standard cars. It might also be argued that a British name would be more respected in the European market than a Chinese name. Nanjing Automobile Group itself merged into SAIC Motor.

More than a decade on the Austin name now belongs to the British Engineer John Stubbs, owner of specialist suspension company Black Art Designs. Stubbs aims to take the Austin name back into the mainstream market, possibly with an electric vehicle.

Plant

Austin started his business in an abandoned print works at Longbridge, Birmingham. Due to its strategic advantages over Morris's Cowley plant, Longbridge became British Leyland's main factory in the early 1970s. Following the Austin marque's discontinuance in 1987, Rover and MG continued to use the plant. The collapse of MG Rover meant it was not used from 2005 until MG production restarted in 2008.

Models

Cars

 Small cars
 1910–1911 Austin 7 hp
 1922–1939 Austin 7
 1959–1961 Seven, as BMC
 1961–1969 Mini, as BMC
 1980–1990 Metro, as Austin Rover
 Small family cars
 1911–1915 Austin 10 hp
 1932–1947 Austin 10
 1939–1947 Austin 8
 1951–1956 A30
 1956–1959 A35
 1956–1962 A35 Countryman
 1954–1961 Nash Metropolitan/Austin Metropolitan
 1958–1961 A40 Farina Mk I
 1961–1967 A40 Farina Mk II
 1963–1974 1100
 1967–1974 1300
 1973–1983 Allegro

 Large family cars
 1913–1914 Austin 15 hp
 1922–1940 Austin "Heavy" 12
 1927–1938 Austin 16 (16/18)
 1931–1936 Austin "Light" 12/6
 1933–1939 Austin "Light" 12/4
 1937–1939 Austin 14
 1938–1939 Austin 18
 1939–1947 Austin 12
 1945–1949 Austin 16 hp
 1947–1952 A40 Devon/Dorset
 1948–1950 A70 Hampshire
 1950–1954 A70 Hereford
 1952–1954 A40 Somerset
 1954–1958 A40/A50/A55 Cambridge
 1954–1959 A90/A95/A105 Westminster
 1959–1961 A55 Cambridge
 1959–1961 A99 Westminster
 1961–1969 A60 Cambridge
 1961–1968 A110 Westminster
 1964–1975 1800/2200 (ADO17)
 1967–1971 3-Litre
 1969–1981 Maxi
 1975–1975 1800/2200 (ADO71)
 1982–1984 Ambassador
 1983–1994 Maestro
 1984–1994 Montego

 Large Cars
 1906–1907 Austin 25/30
 1906–1907 Austin 15/20
 1907–1913 Austin 18/24
 1908–1913 Austin 40 hp
 1908–1910 Austin 60 hp 6-cylinder
 1910–1913 Austin 50 hp 6-cylinder
 1912–1918 Austin 20 hp
 1914–1916 Austin 30 hp
 1919–1938 Austin Twenty
 1938–1939 Austin Twenty Eight (28/6)
 1947–1954 A110/A125 Sheerline
 1946–1956 A120 Princess
 1947–1956 A135 Princess
 1956–1959 Princess IV
 Limousines and Landaulettes
 1906–1907 Austin 25/30
 1906–1907 Austin 15/20
 1907–1913 Austin 18/24
 1908–1913 Austin 40 hp
 1908–1910 Austin 60 hp 6-cylinder
 1910–1913 Austin 50 hp 6-cylinder
 1912–1918 Austin 20 hp
 1914–1916 Austin 30 hp
 1919–1938 Austin Twenty
 1927–1938 Austin 16 (16/18)
 1938–1939 Austin 18
 1938–1939 Austin Twenty Eight
 1947–1954 A110/A125 Sheerline
 1946–1956 A120 Princess
 1947–1956 A135 Princess
 1956–1959 Princess IV
 Sports cars
 1920–1923 Austin Twenty Sports Tourer
 1948–1950 A90 Atlantic Convertible
 1949–1952 A90 Atlantic Saloon
 1950–1953 A40 Sports
 1953–1956 Austin-Healey 100
 1958–1970 Austin-Healey Sprite
 1959–1967 Austin-Healey 3000
 1971 Austin Sprite
 Australian Austin cars
 1958–1962 Austin Lancer
 1962–1966 Austin Freeway
 1970–1973 Austin Kimberley/Tasman

Military vehicles
 Austin Armoured Car - First World War  AFV
  "Car, Light Utility 4 x 2" -  Utility ("Tilly") vehicle version of Austin Ten  produced during Second World War
 Austin K2
  Austin K2/Y - Second World War military ambulance
 Austin K2 fire engine, also used by National Fire Service and post war as ATV
 Austin K4 - truck
Austin K5 - General Service truck and artillery carrier
Austin K6

 1958–1967 Austin Gipsy
 Austin Champ
 c. 1968 Austin Ant

London Taxis
 1929–1934 Austin 12 Taxicab High Lot
 1934–1939 Austin 12 Taxicab Low Loader
 1938–1939 Austin 12 Taxicab Flash Lot
 1948–1958 Austin FX3
 1958–1997 Austin FX4—London Taxi

Ambulances
 LD3
 WWII Austin K2/Y

Commercial vehicles

 Austin also made commercial vehicles, one of which was the FG, previously the Morris FG. The FG was the workhorse that kept Britain running in the 1960s. These Austin FGs and later the Leyland FGs all had petrol or diesel longstroke engines, producing good torque, but very little in the way of speed (40 mph was a good speed out of these vehicles). Leyland were to take over the FG, but before they did, in 1964, the BBC (British Broadcasting Corporation) commissioned six rolling chassis FGs to be coach-built by a Middlesex company, Palmer Coachbuilders. These six vehicles, registration 660 GYE to 666 GYE,  were outdoor broadcast scenery vehicles.

Aircraft
During the First World War Austin built aircraft under licence, including the Royal Aircraft Factory S.E.5a, but also produced a number of its own designs. None of these progressed past the prototype stage. They included:
 Austin-Ball A.F.B.1 (fighter)
 Austin A.F.T.3 (fighter)
 Austin Greyhound (fighter)
 Austin Kestrel (two-seat biplane)
 Austin Osprey (fighter)
 Austin Whippet (post-war civil aircraft)

See also
 List of car manufacturers of the United Kingdom

Notes

References

Further reading

External links

 Austin Memories All about the history of Longbridge and models produced
 Photos of Austin Pickup Van
 The Unofficial Austin-Rover Web Resource
 "Midget Cars Next?" Popular Mechanics, August 1930, pp. 243–245 article on the Austin models offered in 1930
 

British Leyland
English brands
Car brands
Car manufacturers of the United Kingdom
Luxury motor vehicle manufacturers
Companies formerly listed on the London Stock Exchange
Defunct aircraft manufacturers of the United Kingdom
Defunct companies based in Birmingham, West Midlands
Defunct motor vehicle manufacturers of the United Kingdom
Former defence companies of the United Kingdom
Emergency services equipment makers
Vehicle manufacturing companies established in 1905
Vehicle manufacturing companies disestablished in 1987
1905 establishments in England
1987 disestablishments in England
British companies disestablished in 1987
British companies established in 1905